John Michael Hendry (born 6 January 1970) is a Scottish football forward.

Hendry began his career at Dundee before joining English side Tottenham Hotspur in 1990. In April 1991 he scored on his debut in an away defeat at Carrow Road versus Norwich City. A few weeks later he scored a memorable goal, equalising against Manchester United at Old Trafford on the last day of the 1990–91 season, two days after Tottenham had won the 1991 FA Cup Final. Two years later he had a similar impact as Tottenham played rivals Arsenal at Highbury on the last day of the 1992–93 season; Hendry scored twice as Tottenham won 3–1, though Arsenal had rested players ahead of their participation in the 1993 FA Cup Final.

References

External links

Since 1888... The Searchable Premiership and Football League Player Database (subscription required)
Sporting-heroes.net

1970 births
Living people
Scottish footballers
Association football forwards
Premier League players
Dundee F.C. players
Forfar Athletic F.C. players
Tottenham Hotspur F.C. players
Charlton Athletic F.C. players
Swansea City A.F.C. players
Motherwell F.C. players
Stirling Albion F.C. players
Scottish Football League players
English Football League players
Pollok F.C. players